Cannon River Stem School (Specializing in Science, Technology, Engineering, and Math) is a K-8 charter school in Faribault, Minnesota, United States.

History
Cannon River Stem School was originally slated to be on the property of Maltby Nature Preserve, between Stanton and Randolph, until the property went into foreclosure. The school looked for other buildings in the Northfield area, until they received an offer for a former Shattuck-Saint Mary's building. Bus lines, however, run from Northfield and Randolph to the school.

School Board

Current Board
Vanessa Kuhlman (Chair, Community Representative)
Sandy Larson (Vice-Chair/Parent Representative)
Marilyn Bongers (Treasurer, Teacher Representative)
Angela Rosendahl (Secretary, Teacher Representative)
Shelly Cole (Parent Representative)
Chase Flicek (Director)
Dante Hummel-Lingerfelt (Director/Parent Representative)

See also
Faribault, Minnesota
Northfield, Minnesota
Shattuck-Saint Mary's
Northfield School of Arts and Technology

References

Schools in Rice County, Minnesota
Educational institutions established in 2009
Elementary schools in Minnesota
Middle schools in Minnesota
2009 establishments in Minnesota